Bars of Hate is a 1935 American crime film directed by Albert Herman.

Cast
 Regis Toomey as Ted Clark
 Sheila Terry as Ann Dawson
 Molly O'Day as Gertie
 Snub Pollard as Danny, the Pickpocket
 Robert Warwick as The Governor
 Fuzzy Knight as Montague
 Gordon Griffith as Jim Grant

References

External links
 

1935 films
1935 crime films
American crime films
American black-and-white films
Films directed by Albert Herman
1930s English-language films
1930s American films